Erik Michael Gärdebäck (born 22 March 1956) was a Swedish luger who competed in the mid-1970s. He won the silver medal in the men's singles event at the 1976 FIL European Luge Championships in Hammarstrand, Sweden. He also competed at the 1976 Winter Olympics.

, Gärdebäck lives in Nacka and is secretary of the luge club in Saltsjöbadens.

References

External links
  
 Swedish bobsleigh and luge executive officers 

1956 births
Living people
Swedish male lugers
Olympic lugers of Sweden
Lugers at the 1976 Winter Olympics
20th-century Swedish people